"Stato di natura" is a song written and performed by Italian singer Francesca Michielin and Italian rock band Måneskin. The song was released as a digital download on 13 March 2020 by RCA Records as the fifth single from Michielin's fourth studio album Feat (stato di natura). The song has peaked at number 99 on the Italian Singles Chart.

In 2021 "Stato di natura" received a nomination for the Amnesty Award "Voices for Freedom", recognizing song recordings focusing on human rights and released by Italian artists.

Music video
An official music video to accompany the release of "Stato di natura" was first released onto YouTube on 19 March 2020.

Track listing

Charts

Release history

References

2020 songs
2020 singles
Francesca Michielin songs
Måneskin songs